Neurogenin-1 is a protein that in humans is encoded by the NEUROG1 gene.

Interactions 

NEUROG1 has been shown to interact with CREB-binding protein and decapentaplegic homolog 1.

References

Further reading 

 
 
 
 
 
 

Human proteins